Jack Darmody (1 September 1910 – 9 April 1990) was an Australian rules footballer from Kapunda, South Australia. Jack captained the Port Adelaide Football Club to back-to-back premierships in 1936 and 1937.

References

1910 births
1990 deaths
Australian rules footballers from South Australia
Port Adelaide Football Club players (all competitions)
Port Adelaide Football Club (SANFL) players
People from Kapunda